Moskvyata is the name of several rural localities in Russia:
Moskvyata, Vereshchaginsky District, Perm Krai, a village in Vereshchaginsky District, Perm Krai
Moskvyata, Permsky District, Perm Krai, a village in Permsky District, Perm Krai